Red Garter is a hotel and casino located in West Wendover, Nevada just west of Rainbow.  As of 2022, the Red Garter Hotel remained operated by Maverick Gaming.

History

Red Garter was originally a smaller casino with a connecting Super 8 motel adjacent to it. Red Garter began operation in 1983. In 2004 Holder Hospitality Group purchased the casino from Full House Inc. and retained its current management and staff.

As of January 2009 it employed 155 people.

With changes in the economy, the gambling industry experienced major losses, and in January 2009, it was announced that the Red Garter was to be closed on March 3. However, the casino remained open and continued operations under the Holder Group.

On February 19, 2010, the Holder Hospitality Group filed for bankruptcy protection for the Red Garter Casino. The following Tuesday, February 23, 2010 the casino was sold to the owners of the Wendover Nugget casino. The primary owner became David A. Ensign, half-brother of Senator John Ensign.

Following guidelines from the Nevada Gaming Commission and Control Board, Red Garter Hotel & Casino and other West Wendover casinos reopened on June 11, 2020. After two months of emptiness, some slot machines and table games remained closed. As of 2022, the Red Garter Hotel remained operated by Maverick Gaming.

Features 
Red Garter underwent renovations in 2010 (while remaining open), and afterwards offered 9 single deck Royal Match Blackjack tables, 1 Double Zero Roulette, 1 Three Card Poker table, and 1 Craps table. A new slot floor was added featuring a new players card system and ticket in/out systems. The interior of the casino had major improvements, including a new hotel registration desk, a new gift shop, new restrooms, and new carpet throughout the casino.

In some of the more recent days during the Corona times, it even had to close for some time due to local state measures, but its open like normal back again.

See also
List of casinos in Nevada

References

External links
Official website

Casino hotels
Casinos completed in 1983
Casinos in West Wendover, Nevada
Hotel buildings completed in 1983